Wendel da Silva Costa (born 2 August 2000) is a Brazilian footballer who plays for Portuguese club Porto B as a forward.

Career

Flamengo

Leixões
On 25 August 2020 Leixões signed Wendel from Flamengo on a free transfer.

Career statistics

Club

References

2000 births
Footballers from Rio de Janeiro (city)
Living people
Brazilian footballers
Association football forwards
CR Flamengo footballers
Leixões S.C. players
S.C. Covilhã players
FC Porto B players
Liga Portugal 2 players
Brazilian expatriate footballers
Brazilian expatriate sportspeople in Portugal
Expatriate footballers in Portugal